PPID may refer to:
Peptidylprolyl isomerase D, and enzyme encoded within the PPID gene
Pituitary Pars Intermedia Dysfunction in horses.

Computer Science

Private Personal Identifier in Security Assertion Markup Language
Parent process ID. Process identifier of the parent of a process.